Artocarpus lamellosus is a tree in the family Moraceae and a wild species of the breadfruit/jackfruit genus (Artocarpus); it may be referred to as the butong in Tagalog and its Vietnamese name is mít nhỏ (also chay rừng which may be used for other forest species of Artocarpus).  Distribution records are from China (Guangdong, Guangxi, Hainan, S Hunan, S Yunnan), Indo-China and Malesia (including the Philippines) through to New Guinea.

Formerly placed here 
 A. nitidus subsp. borneensis (→Artocarpus borneensis)
 A. nitidus subsp. griffithii (→Artocarpus griffithii)
 A. nitidus subsp. humilis (→Artocarpus humilis)
 A. nitidus subsp. lingnanensis (→Artocarpus parvus)

References

External links 
 

Artocarpus
Flora of Indo-China
Flora of Malesia